Paistu is a village in Viljandi Parish, Viljandi County, Estonia. Until October 2013, it was the administrative centre of Paistu Parish. Paistu has a population of ~350.

References

Villages in Viljandi County
Kreis Fellin